Ljubiša Jovanović (1 October 1908 – 15 July 1971) was a Serbian actor who appeared in more than forty films from 1946 to 1970.

Selected filmography

References

External links 

1908 births
1971 deaths
Serbian male film actors